The 1975–76 NCAA Division I men's basketball season began in November 1975, progressed through the regular season and conference tournaments, and concluded with the 1976 NCAA Men's Division I Basketball Tournament Championship Game on March 29, 1976, at the Spectrum in Philadelphia, Pennsylvania. The Indiana Hoosiers won their third NCAA national championship with a 86–68 victory over the Michigan Wolverines.

Season headlines 
 The Metro Conference began play, with six original members.
 The last basketball season for the Yankee Conference, which dropped all sports except football at the end of the season.
 Indiana went undefeated (32–0) during the season.
 In the Pacific 8 Conference, UCLA won its 10th of what would ultimately be 13 consecutive conference titles.

Season outlook

Pre-season polls 

The top 20 from the AP Poll during the pre-season.

Conference membership changes

Regular season

Conference winners and tournaments 

From 1975 to 1982, the Eastern College Athletic Conference (ECAC), a loosely organized sports federation of Northeastern colleges and universities, organized Division I ECAC regional tournaments for those of its members that were independents in basketball. Each 1976 tournament winner received an automatic bid to the 1976 NCAA Men's Division I Basketball Tournament in the same way that the tournament champions of conventional athletic conferences did.

Informal championships

Statistical leaders

Post-season tournaments

NCAA tournament

Final Four 

 Third Place – UNLV 106, Rutgers 92

National Invitation tournament

Semifinals & finals 

 Third Place – NC State 74, Providence 69

Awards

Consensus All-American teams

Major player of the year awards 

 Naismith Award: Scott May, Indiana
 Helms Player of the Year: Kent Benson, Indiana, & Scott May, Indiana
 Associated Press Player of the Year: Scott May, Indiana
 UPI Player of the Year: Scott May, Indiana
 NABC Player of the Year: Scott May, Indiana
 Oscar Robertson Trophy (USBWA): Adrian Dantley, Notre Dame
 Adolph Rupp Trophy: Scott May, Indiana
 Sporting News Player of the Year: Scott May, Indiana

Major coach of the year awards 

 Associated Press Coach of the Year: Bob Knight, Indiana
 Henry Iba Award (USBWA): Johnny Orr, Michigan
 NABC Coach of the Year: Johnny Orr, Michigan
 UPI Coach of the Year: Tom Young, Rutgers
 Sporting News Coach of the Year: Tom Young, Rutgers

Other major awards 

 Frances Pomeroy Naismith Award (Best player under 6'0): Frank Alagia, St. John's
 Robert V. Geasey Trophy (Top player in Philadelphia Big 5): Charlie Wise, La Salle
 NIT/Haggerty Award (Top player in New York City metro area): Phil Sellers, Rutgers

Coaching changes 

A number of teams changed coaches throughout the season and after the season ended.

References